Harry Steel may refer to:

Harry Steel (politician) (1879–1962), Canadian politician
Harry Steel (wrestler) (1899–1971), American wrestler

See also
Harry Steele (disambiguation)